Kenni Sommer (born 2 August 1974) is a retired Danish football midfielder.

References

1974 births
Living people
Danish men's footballers
Silkeborg IF players
Viborg FF players
Esbjerg fB players
Danish Superliga players
Association football midfielders